Rivula tanitalis is a species of moth of the family Noctuidae first described by Hans Rebel in 1912. It is found in Morocco, Egypt, Algeria, Malta, Crete, Greece, Lebanon, Iraq, Iran, Saudi Arabia, Yemen and Israel.

The species is usually found in oases.

There are several generations per year.

External links

Image

Hypeninae
Moths of Europe
Moths of Asia
Moths of the Middle East